Northcote Central is a suburb of Auckland's North Shore, in northern New Zealand. It is located on the northern shore of the Waitematā Harbour.

The Northcote Shopping Centre is anchored by a Countdown supermarket.

Tuff Crater, or Tank Farm, is a volcanic crater on the eastern side of the suburb.

Demographics

Northcote Central had a population of 5,739 at the 2018 New Zealand census, an increase of 45 people (0.8%) since the 2013 census, and an increase of 189 people (3.4%) since the 2006 census. There were 1,905 households, comprising 2,745 males and 2,991 females, giving a sex ratio of 0.92 males per female, with 846 people (14.7%) aged under 15 years, 1,548 (27.0%) aged 15 to 29, 2,250 (39.2%) aged 30 to 64, and 1,086 (18.9%) aged 65 or older.

Ethnicities were 52.1% European/Pākehā, 10.4% Māori, 12.4% Pacific peoples, 30.3% Asian, and 4.7% other ethnicities. People may identify with more than one ethnicity.

The percentage of people born overseas was 44.1, compared with 27.1% nationally.

Although some people chose not to answer the census's question about religious affiliation, 44.6% had no religion, 40.4% were Christian, 0.9% had Māori religious beliefs, 2.3% were Hindu, 1.9% were Muslim, 1.8% were Buddhist and 2.7% had other religions.

Of those at least 15 years old, 1,416 (28.9%) people had a bachelor's or higher degree, and 585 (12.0%) people had no formal qualifications. 732 people (15.0%) earned over $70,000 compared to 17.2% nationally. The employment status of those at least 15 was that 2,127 (43.5%) people were employed full-time, 645 (13.2%) were part-time, and 234 (4.8%) were unemployed.

Education

It celebrated its 50th jubilee in 2008. It shares a site with Northcote Intermediate.

Both schools are coeducational. Rolls are as of 

Auckland University of Technology has its North Campus on Akoranga Drive.

Hato Petera College was a secondary (years 9–13) school. It opened as Saint Peter's Catechist School in 1928 and changed its name in 1972. It was a state integrated Catholic Māori school, and offered full-time boarding for enrolled students until the end of 2016, when it became a day school. It closed in 2018.

Notes

External links
 Hato Petera College website
 Northcote Intermediate website

Suburbs of Auckland